Concord Township is the name of two townships in the U.S. state of Indiana:

 Concord Township, DeKalb County, Indiana
 Concord Township, Elkhart County, Indiana

See also
Concord Township (disambiguation)

Indiana township disambiguation pages